Crane High School, home of the Pirates, is a public high school located on Missouri Route 413 in Crane, Missouri. Crane High School is a part of Missouri State High School Activities Association which acts as the governing body for high school activities throughout the state of Missouri.

History 
Crane High School was one of the first founding buildings in Crane in the early 1800s.

Athletics

Boys Basketball 

State Champion—2011
State Champion-2012

Baseball

 3rd in State - 1988
 2nd in State - 1992
 2nd in State - 1993

Girls Basketball 
 State Champion—2013
 State Champion—2014
 State Champion—2015
 State Champion—2016

References

External links
 Crane R-3 Homepage
 Crane High School Homepage

Public high schools in Missouri
Stone County, Missouri